Diocese of Zagreb may refer to:

 Roman Catholic Diocese of Zagreb, central archdiocese of the Catholic Church in Croatia
 Serbian Orthodox Diocese of Zagreb, Eastern Orthodox diocese

See also
Catholic Church in Croatia
Eastern Orthodoxy in Croatia
Diocese of Požega (disambiguation)
Diocese of Zadar (disambiguation)
Diocese of Šibenik (disambiguation)